The Fina Faunal Reserve is found in Mali. It was established in 1954. This site is 1086 km².

References

Protected areas of Mali
Protected areas established in 1954
Faunal reserves